In Greek mythology, Creon, son of Lycaethus, was a king of Corinth and father of Hippotes and Creusa or Glauce, whom Jason would marry if not for the intervention of Medea.

Mythology 
According to a lost play by Euripides summarized in the Bibliotheca, Alcmaeon entrusted to Creon's care his two children by Manto—a son Amphilochus and a daughter Tisiphone. The latter grew up to be so pretty that Creon's wife sold her away as a slave, fearing that Creon might abandon her in favor of the maiden. Tisiphone was bought by her own father Alcmaeon, who failed to recognize her and did not get to know the truth until he came to Corinth to fetch his children.

Creon is best known in connection with the myth of Jason and Medea mentioned above. He showed hospitality towards the couple, and later expressed consent for Jason to marry his daughter. Ultimately, he fell victim to Medea's subsequent revenge, getting burned to death as he was attempting to rescue his daughter from similar fate.

Notes

References 

 Apollodorus, The Library with an English Translation by Sir James George Frazer, F.B.A., F.R.S. in 2 Volumes, Cambridge, MA, Harvard University Press; London, William Heinemann Ltd. 1921. ISBN 0-674-99135-4. Online version at the Perseus Digital Library. Greek text available from the same website.
 Gaius Julius Hyginus, Fabulae from The Myths of Hyginus translated and edited by Mary Grant. University of Kansas Publications in Humanistic Studies. Online version at the Topos Text Project.

Kings of Corinth

Kings in Greek mythology
Corinthian characters in Greek mythology